Soap Hub is an online magazine that covers American daytime soap operas. It features on-screen and off-screen news about both current and past soap operas, interviews with daytime stars, article updates about the stars' lives, storyline summaries and previews. While its focus is on the four remaining daytime soap operas—The Young and the Restless, General Hospital, Days of our Lives, and The Bold and the Beautiful—past soaps are often featured, as well as news about the up-and-coming web soap industry.

Founded in 2014, by Ramon Van Meer, Soap Hub is the product of more than a combined century of passion, knowledge, and understanding of soaps. Between the team, there is over 100 years of soap watching and soap writing experience.

The aim for Soap Hub is to always be a place soap fans can go to and find all the information they need on the stories, stars, and behind-the-scenes happenings. From flashback videos and stories to exclusive interviews, detailed and entertaining spoilers, and no-holds-barred commentary, Soap Hub is the daytime spot for the 21st century. Soap Hub launched its mobile app for soap lovers to receive news updates, spoilers, puzzles, polls and gossip.

Staff

Diane Brounstein, Editor-In-Chief 
Diane Brounstein is a seasoned writer/editor/researcher with decades of experience in the soap opera industry. She started her career as an intern on three soaps — Santa Barbara, Guiding Light, and General Hospital, often working in the casting offices.

Later, she worked as a senior editor at Soap Opera Magazine and was a managing editor at Sony's SoapCity Website. She also worked as a researcher on 50 Years of Soaps: An All-Star Celebration for CBS, while spending 10 years working in the research and production end on the Daytime Emmy Awards for Dick Clark Productions, and on Soapography for SoapNet, where she was also promoted to an associate producer.

After spending time working on websites for CBS local news sites in Los Angeles and Las Vegas, she moved over to project management for a digital marketing agency. She joined the staff of Soap Hub back in 2016 and spends her days watching soaps with the rest of us.

While watching, Diane writes, edits, creates images, interviews your favorite stars, attends soap events for the latest news, and offers insightful commentaries on the goings-on throughout the daytime world.

Ashley Toering, Managing Editor 
Ashley Toering has always held a special place in her heart for the soap genre as she grew up watching them with her grandmother, and her parents actually named her after Ashley Abbott on The Young and the Restless.

After joining the Soap Hub team her love of daytime dramas and their dynamic characters has only grown. Once she received her communication and advertising degree she began a career in the world of digital media. Ashley spends her days watching soaps, working on the daily newsletters for all four of the on-air soaps, writing spoiler photo articles for Days of our Lives, and the weekly spoilers updates.

Sherrie E. Smith, Senior Editor 
Sherrie E. Smith is a Writer and Producer, with 31 years of experience working in the Entertainment Industry. Sherrie spent a decade at E! Entertainment Television working on three daily Talk Shows, Inside Word, Talk Soup, and Pure Soap, producing late-breaking news for E! News Daily.

She interviewed hundreds of celebrities, and covered Live Red Carpet Award Shows such as The Academy Awards, The Golden Globes, The Grammys, The Primetime Emmys, The Daytime Emmys, and Movie Premiere Specials and other Special Events with Joan and Melissa Rivers, Greg Kinnear, Steve Kmetko, Michael Castner, Tom O’Neil, Gina St. John, Jules Asner, Arthel Neville and countless more.

Sherrie followed up her stint at E! working at Sony Pictures Television, as a writer, producer, and casting associate for the #1 rated Soap Opera, The Young and the Restless, while producing, creating, and maintaining the award-winning Official websites for the show.

Ms. Smith comes to SoapHub with tons of Industry knowledge that covers everything from Set Design, Technical Production, Directing, Producing, Writing, Acting, Editing, Casting, and enough insider trivia to make you blush!

Michael Maloney, West Coast Editor 
Michael Maloney is a veteran Los Angeles-based entertainment reporter. As Senior West Coast Editor of Soap Hub, he's on top of the latest news, casting, behind-the-scenes changes, and trends in the world of daytime drama.

He can often be found on a red carpet talking to your favorite daytime stars. Michael wrote The Young and Restless Life of William J. Bell, the authorized biography of the late William J. Bell, creator of both The Young and the Restless and The Bold and the Beautiful.

He's a graduate of Boston University's College of Communication and has been on the production staff of BB. Michael also served as a creative consultant on the Pop TV series Queens of Drama. Michael's career in soaps began soon after college when he worked as a CBS page on the sets of Y&R and B&B.  He has written for a variety of publications about television including TV Guide, TODAY.com, Variety, and The Boston Herald.

Laura Granados, Editor 
Laura Granados grew up watching Mexican telenovelas and studied communications. She started her career as an English teacher and parleyed into the entertainment industry when she began translating articles for a Mexican magazine.

She quickly gained a strong sense of the industry and focused on growing her connections. In 2018, Laura joined Soap Hub's sister site, TelenovelaFan as a creative producer, and became a key player in defining the site, and curating content, using her connection to Telenovela stars and their agents.

She expanded her role and joined Soap Hub in 2020. Laura uses her vast knowledge of soaps, crossing two major industries, to help both sites stay ahead of the curve!

Amber Sinclair, Assistant Editor 
Amber Sinclair started watching soap operas before she was born. Like many daytime drama fans, she was grandmother/mothered into soaps by her Nana.

Together they’d watch soaps whenever they could. Amber grew up on The Young and the Restless and The Bold and the Beautiful. At one point, she thought Eric Braeden (Victor Newman, Y&R) was her father.

Hilarious moments like those have kept her watching soap operas to this day. Needless to say, that passion grew into creating a massive social media group around her shows (20K members and counting), and a wonderful career as a writer and assistant editor for Soap Hub.

Alina Adams, Contributing Writer 
Alina Adams has been a contributing writer for Soap Hub since 2016 and comes to us via the world of mystery books, romance novels, soap history tomes, soap production, and just about any other type of entertaining and informational writing you can think of.

She writes up our daily polls, giving our readers a good chuckle along the way. Plus, you never want to miss her on-point daily The Young and the Restless spoilers and recaps. Catch Alina on Instagram and on Facebook!

Janet Di Lauro, Contributing Writer 
Janet DiLauro joined the Soap Hub team in 2016 and comes to us from decades of work in soap opera journalism. A New York native, Janet has worked for the former Daytime TV magazine and its sister publications.

She also spent many years as West Coast Editor of Soap Opera Weekly magazine and has contributed to dozens of entertainment publications throughout the years.

Janet writes our weekly comings and goings articles, keeping our readers apprised of the latest casting changes. She also makes sure our weekly news wrap is ready for you every week and delivers on in-depth interviews with your favorite stars.

Rachel Dillin, Contributing Writer 
Rachel Dillin is a writer, editor, and researcher with 10 years of experience writing about soaps. She started writing as a teenager and began watching soaps as a child with her grandmother like many daytime fans.

She joined the staff of Soap Hub in 2016, writing about soaps and editing for several years, and returned in 2021. Rachel spends her days watching soaps while she writes and edits articles about your (and her) favorite storylines and stars.

Keith Loria, Contributing Writer 
Keith Loria joined the Soap Hub team in 2020, bringing with him more than 25 years of entertainment journalism experience and four decades of being a fan of soaps.

A graduate of the University of Miami, Keith spent three years at Soap Opera Digest in the ’90s, covering Sunset Beach, the “Where are they Now” column and handling news. He moved to Soap Opera Magazine, where he covered All My Children and One Life to Live for the publication. He also worked with the late Kristoff St. John on his Backstage Pass Daytime Emmy videos, handling red carpet duties and post-party interviews.

He has watched Days of our Lives on and off since he was 10 years old, enthralled by the Salem Strangler and the introduction of Stefano DiMera soon after. His favorite soap memory is drinking martinis with the late Joseph Mascolo at a soap opera event.

Garren Waldo, Contributing Writer 
Garren Waldo is Soap Hub's very own Southern Fried Spitfire, and he's an expert on all things serialized – from today's delicious offerings all the way back to the genre's glory days.

His mastery might have something to do with all those ancient VHS tapes stuffed full of sudsy goodness that belonged to his grandmother and mother – or it can be blamed on the fact that he's never picked up a TV tie-in that he didn't read.

Garren recaps each and every episode of Days of our Lives and General Hospital, spoils a plethora of upcoming plotlines, covers news – breaking and otherwise – and he's always quick to offer his sometimes curt, but always heartfelt critique. He knows that it isn't wrong to prefer the original Roman on Days of our Lives, he'll argue up and down that The Doctors always had a leg up on General Hospital, and yes The Edge of Night is far and away the best daytime TV program ever offered.

References

External links
 Official website

Magazines about soap operas
Online magazines published in the United States
Magazines established in 2014